The Sumpul River is a river in north-western El Salvador on the border with Honduras. It flows through the Chalatenango Department.

On 14 May 1980, the river and the nearby village of Las Aradas were the site of a massacre by the Salvadoran Armed Forces that left between 300 and 600 people dead.

References

Rivers of El Salvador
Chalatenango Department
El Salvador–Honduras border
International rivers of North America
Border rivers